OPQ may refer to:
 Office des professions du Québec, a Quebec organization (in Canada)
 Occupational Personality Questionnaires